Huaytapallana (possibly from in the Quechua spelling Waytapallana; wayta wild flower, a little bunch of flowers, pallay to collect, pallana an instrument to collect fruit / collectable, Waytapallana "a place where you collect wild flowers",) or Lasuntay is the highest peak in the Huaytapallana mountain range in the Andes of Peru. The mountain is situated in the Junín Region, Huancayo Province, in the districts of Huancayo and Pariahuanca.

References

External links

Mountains of Peru
Mountains of Junín Region